P′′ (P double prime) is a primitive computer programming language created by Corrado Böhm in 1964 to describe a family of Turing machines.

Definition
 (hereinafter written P′′) is formally defined as a set of words on the four-instruction alphabet , as follows:

Syntax
 If  is a word in P′′, then  is a word in P′′.
 Only words derivable from the previous three rules are words in P′′.

Semantics
 All instructions in P′′ are permutations of the set  of all possible tape configurations; that is, all possible configurations of both the contents of the tape and the position of the tape-head.
  is a predicate saying that the current symbol is not . It is not an instruction and is not used in programs, but is instead used to help define the language.
  means move the tape-head rightward one cell (if possible).
  means the function composition . In other words, the instruction  is performed before .
  means iterate  in a while loop, with the condition .

Relation to other programming languages 
 P′′ was the first "GOTO-less" imperative structured programming language to be proven Turing-complete
 The Brainfuck language (apart from its I/O commands) is a minor informal variation of P′′. Note that since , incrementing the current symbol  times will wrap around so that the result is to "decrement" the symbol in the current cell by one.

Example program 
Böhm gives the following program to compute the predecessor (x-1) of an integer x > 0:

which translates directly to the equivalent Brainfuck program:
 >[>]<[−[<[<]]−<]>+
The program expects an integer to be represented in bijective base-k notation, with  encoding the digits  respectively, and to have  before and after the digit-string. At the beginning and end of the computation, the tape-head is on the  preceding the digit-string.

References

Weblinks 
 P′′Online interpreter: Demonstrating the iterative 99 Bottles of Beer song construed in 337568 P′′ instructions. 

Models of computation
Academic programming languages
Experimental programming languages